The 2016 Jerez Superbike World Championship round was the twelfth round of the 2016 Superbike World Championship. It took place over the weekend of 14–16 October 2016 at the Circuito de Jerez.

Championship standings after the race

Championship standings after Race 1

Championship standings after Race 2

Supersport Championship standings

External links
 Superbike Race 1 results
 Superbike Race 2 results
 Supersport Race results

2016 Superbike World Championship season
2016 in Spanish motorsport
October 2016 sports events in Europe